This article consists of the busiest railway stations in Republic of China (Taiwan), with the statistics being taken from the official data of the years 2020. Ridership numbers are for Inter-city rail systems, Taiwan Railways Administration (TRA) and Taiwan High Speed Rail (THSR) only, other rail transport like MRT are not included.

TRA
Only the top 20 busiest TRA stations are shown.

THSR

All 12 THSR stations are shown. Ridership numbers were decreased in 2020 due to COVID-19 outbreak.

References

Railway stations, busiest
Busiest railway stations in Taiwan